Elizabeth Alice Broderick (born February 24, 1959) is an American actress. She portrayed Zelda Spellman in the ABC/WB television sitcom Sabrina the Teenage Witch (1996–2003). She also had recurring roles as Diane Janssen in the ABC mystery drama series Lost (2005–2008) and as Rose Twitchell in the CBS science fiction drama series Under the Dome (2013).

Early life
Beth Broderick was born in Falmouth, Kentucky, the daughter of Nina Lou (née Bowden) and Thomas Joseph Broderick. She grew up in Huntington Beach, California. Even as a child, she was interested in theatre. She graduated from high school at sixteen, and then from the American Academy of Arts in Pasadena, California, at the age of 18. Afterwards, she moved to New York City to pursue an acting career. She has two sisters.

Career
Billed as Elizabeth Alice Broderick, and later as Norris O'Neal, she made her debut in two adult films, In Love (1983) and Bordello: House of the Rising Sun (1985). Both roles portrayed her as a lesbian and were financially unsuccessful. Again as Norris O'Neal, she appeared in the mainstream comedy Sex Appeal (1986). In 1986 she had small roles in If Looks Could Kill, Student Affairs, Young Nurses in Love, and Slammer Girls, a spoof of the women in prison film genre.

Her first significant role was in Stealing Home (1988), in which she played Leslie, a young woman who seduces a teenager (played by Jonathan Silverman). In 1990, she had a small part in The Bonfire of the Vanities. Her movie credits include Man of the Year (1995), Maternal Instincts (1996), Breast Men (1997), Psycho Beach Party (2000) and The Inner Circle (2003). She also played a small role in the movie Fools Rush In (1997), with Matthew Perry and Salma Hayek, as a business woman. In the film Timber Falls, she played a crazy religious woman, who together with her husband and brother, torture couples who break the rules of chastity while camping.

Her television credits include Married... with Children, The 5 Mrs. Buchanans, Hearts Afire, Supernatural and Glory Days. She guest starred on Northern Exposure in the 1992 episode "It Happened In Juneau", playing a lusty doctor hunting for a one-night stand with Dr. Joel Fleischman, played by Rob Morrow. In 1997 she appeared in the racy Showtime series Women: Stories of Passion ("The Bitter and the Sweet" 2:17). She had a minor, recurring role in the hit ABC series Lost as Kate Austen's mother, Diane. She played a minor role in CSI: Miami during a tsunami where she played a neighbor of CSI Ryan Wolfe's uncle. More recently, she had guest starring roles on Leverage and Castle. In 2019, she was in "Sister of the Bride", a Hallmark channel movie.

She has appeared in several theater productions like Carnal Knowledge, Triplets in Uniform and Zastrozzi, the Master of Discipline (which she also co-produced). In New York she has starred in The Mousetrap, The Lion in Winter and many more. She was recently in the Chicago Northlight Theatre production of the one-woman show titled Bad Dates.

Broderick has written A Cup of Joe, Wonderland and Literatti with Dennis Bailey.

She directed three episodes of Sabrina, the Teenage Witch: "Guilty!" (2002), "Cloud Ten" (2002), and "Making the Grade" (2001).

Personal life
Broderick had a year-long romance with director Brian De Palma during production of The Bonfire of the Vanities (1990). In 1998, Broderick married Brian Porizek, and the couple divorced on July 11, 2000. She married Scott Paetty on April 29, 2005. 

Broderick is a founding member of Momentum, one of the first organizations in New York established to assist people with AIDS. She is also a founding member of the Celebrity Action Council of the City Light Women's Rehabilitation Program, which provides hands-on service to homeless women, helping them overcome substance abuse and learn job skills.

Broderick lived in Austin, Texas as of 2014, where she appears in indie films and local theater productions.

Filmography

Film

Television

References

External links

1959 births
Living people
Actresses from California
American television actresses
American film actresses
American voice actresses
Actresses from Huntington Beach, California
20th-century American actresses
21st-century American actresses
People from Pendleton County, Kentucky